The list of awards and nominations received by the American Latin pop duo Ha*Ash consists of  27 awards and 52 nominations ranging from publications such as American Society of Composers, Authors and Publishers, Billboard Latin Music Awards, MTV Europe Music Awards,  MTV Millennial Awards, Premios Juventud and Lo Nuestro Awards. The band was formed in 2002 by sisters Hanna Nicole  and Ashley Grace. They have released five studio albums — Ha*Ash (2003), Mundos opuestos (2005), Habitación Doble (2008), A Tiempo (2011) and 30 de Febrero (2017) and two live albums — Primera Fila: Hecho Realidad (2014) and Ha*Ash: En Vivo (2019).

In December 2007, they joined charities in launching the Fondo Ha*Ash, which supports children suffering from HIV/AIDS and immigrants. Ha*Ash received the 2012 Pro Social Award and the 2016 Agentes de Cambio Award of the Kids Choice Awards Mexico, announced by Nickelodeon Latin America, for this social work.

Academia Nacional de la Música 
Academia Nacional de la Música en México (ANAMUSA).

|-
|2004
!Ha*Ash
|Young Artist of the Year
| 
|}

American Society of Composers, Authors and Publishers 
The American Society of Composers, Authors and Publishers (ASCAP) presents a series of annual awards in seven different music categories: pop, rhythm and soul, film and television, Latin, country, Christian, and concert music.

|-
|2009
!"No Te Quiero Nada"
|Most Performed Pop/Ballad
| 
|}

Billboard Latin Music Awards 
The Billboard Latin Music Awards are awarded annually by the Billboard magazine in the United States.

|-
|2009
!"No Te Quiero Nada"
|Favorite Song
| 
|-
|2016
!Ha*Ash
|Latin Pop Song Artist of the Year Duo or Group	
| 
|}

Fans Choice Awards 
The Fans Choice Awards were awarded annually in Mexico.

|-
|2015
!Ha*Ash
|Latin pop
|
|-
|2016
!Ha*Ash
|Latin pop
|
|-
|2018
!Ha*Ash
|Latin pop
|
|-
|2021
!Ha*Ash
|Streaming concert - Artist female
|
|-
|2021
!Ha*Ash
|Pop Duo
|
|}

Heat Latin Music Awards 
The Heat Latin Music Awards is an annual awards show that airs on the HTV cable channel.

|-
|2016
!Ha*Ash
|Best Pop Group or Duo Rock
| 
|}

Irresistible Awards Fanta 
The Irresistible Awards Fanta were awarded annually in Mexico.

|-
|2012
!"Te Dejo En Libertad"
|Irresistible Song
| 
|-
|2012
!"Impermeable"
|Irresistible Dance Song
| 
|-
|2012
!Ha*Ash
|Irresistible Artist
| 
|}

Lo Nuestro Awards 
The Lo Nuestro Awards are awarded annually by the Univision television network in the United States.

|-
|2005
! rowspan="2" |Ha*Ash
|Best New Soloist or Grup of the Year
| 
|-
|2016
|Pop Group or Duo of the Year
| 
|}

Lunas del Auditorio 
Lunas del Auditorio are sponsored by the National Auditorium in Mexico to honor the best live shows in the country.

|-
|2013
! rowspan="5" |Ha*Ash
|Pop in Spanish
| 
|-
|2015
|Pop in Spanish
| 
|-
|2016
|Pop in Spanish
| 
|-
|2017
|Pop in Spanish
| 
|-
|2019
|Pop in Spanish
| 
|}

MTV Awards

MTV Europe Music Awards 
The MTV Europe Music Awards were established in 1994 by MTV Networks Europe to celebrate the most popular music videos in Europe.

|-
|2015
! rowspan="2" |Ha*Ash
| rowspan="2" |Best Latam North Act
| 
|-
|2018
| 
|}

MTV Millennial Awards 
The MTV Millennial Awards is an annual program of Latin American music awards, presented by the cable channel MTV Latin America to honor the best of Latin music and the digital world of the millennial generation. The awards are the Latin version of the MTV Video Music Award.

|-
|2015
!"Lo Aprendí de Ti"
|Favorite Song	
| 
|-
|2015
!Ha*Ash
|National Artist Year
| 
|-
|2016
!"Perdón, Perdón"
|Favorite Song	
| 
|}

Nickelodeon Kids' Choice Awards México 
The Nickelodeon Kids' Choice Awards is an annual awards show that airs on the Nickelodeon cable channel that honours the year's biggest television, film, and music acts, as voted by Nickelodeon viewers.

|-
|2011
! rowspan="3" |Ha*Ash
|Pop Group or Duo of the Year
| 
|-
|2012
|Philanthropy (Save the children)
| 
|-
|2013
|Pop Group or Duo of the Year
| 
|-
|2016
!"Perdón, Perdón"
|Favorite Song	
| 
|-
|2016
! rowspan="2" |Ha*Ash
|Agents of Change (Foundation Ha*ash)
| 
|-
|2018
|National Artist
| 
|}

Orgullosamente Latino Awards 
The Orgullosamente Latino Awards are accolades awarded for the best in Latin music since 2004.

|-
|2004
!Estés Donde Estés
|Favorite Song	
| 
|}

Premios 40 Principales 
The Premios 40 Principales for Best Latin Artist was an honor presented annually at Los Premios 40 Principales, a ceremony that recognizes excellence in music, organised by Spain's top music radio Los 40 Principales.

|-
|2009
|Ha*Ash
|Best International Artist 
| 
|}

Premios Dial 
The Premios Dial is an annual awards show that airs on Cadena Dial.

|-
|2009
!"No Te Quiero Nada"
|The Best Spain 2009
| 
|}

Premios Juventud 
The Premios Juventud are awarded annually by the Univision television network in the United States.

|-
|2006
!"Tu Mirada en Mi"
|Favorite Song
| 
|-
|2016
!"Perdón, Perdón"
|Favorite Song
| 
|}

Premios Oye! 
Premios Oye! are presented annually by the Academia Nacional de la Música en México for outstanding achievements in Mexican record industry.

|-
|2006
! Ha*Ash
|Pop Group or Duo of the Year
| 
|-
|2012
!"Te Dejo En Libertad"
|Favorite Song
| 
|-
|2012
! Ha*Ash
|Grupo Pop
| 
|}

Premios Quiero 
The Premios Quiero is an annual awards show that airs on the "Quiero música en mi idioma" cable channel.

|-
| rowspan="3" |2015
! rowspan="2" |"Perdón, Perdón"
|Best Music Video
| 
|-
|Video Of The Year
| 
|-
!"Te Dejo En Libertad"
|Best Music Video
| 
|-
|2016
!"Sé Que Te Vas"
|Best Music Video
| 
|-
| rowspan="2" |2018
! rowspan="2" |"No Pasa Nada"
|Best Music Video Woman	
| 
|-
|Best Music Video
| 
|}

Society of Authors and Composers of Mexico 
The Society of Authors and Composers of Mexico is a Mexican not-for-profit performance-rights organization.

|-
|2011
!"Te Dejo En Libertad"
|Success SACM
| 
|-
|2012
!"¿De Dónde Sacas Eso?"
|Success SACM
| 
|-
|2015
!"Perdón, Perdón"
|Success SACM
| 
|-
|2016
!"Lo Aprendí de Ti"
|Success SACM
| 
|}

Spotify Awards 
Is an award show based entirely on user-generated data from our listeners in Mexico, with the promise of rewarding the most listened to by the public through this famous platform.

|-
|2020
!Ha*Ash
|Most popular pop artist
| 
|}

Telehit Awards 
Telehit Awards is an annual award show run by the Mexican music channel Telehit.

|-
|2009
! rowspan="1" |Ha*Ash
|Young Artist of the Year
| 
|-
|2017
! rowspan="1" |1F Hecho Realidad Tour
|Tour of the Year
| 
|}

Viña del Mar International Song Festival 
The Viña del Mar International Song Festival is a music festival that has been held annually during the 3rd week of February in Viña del Mar, Chile.

|-
| rowspan="3" |2018
!Ashley Grace
|Popular Queen
| 
|-
!Ha*Ash
|Gaviota de Plata| Gaviota de Plata
| 
|-
!Ha*Ash
|Gaviota de Oro
| 
|}

See also 
 Ha*Ash discography
 List of songs recorded by Ha*Ash

References 

Awards
Lists of awards received by American musician
Lists of awards received by Mexican musician
Lists of awards received by musical group